State Road 713 (SR 713) is a state highway in the U.S. state of Florida locally known as Kings Highway and Turnpike Feeder Road. The -long, two-lane north–south road is a popular truck route connecting SR 70 in Fort Pierce to the south and U.S. Route 1 (SR 5) between Viking and Florida Ridge to the north. While urbanization is encroaching upon SR 713 north of SR 68, most of SR 713 passes through woodland interspersed with orange groves.

Route description
SR 713 begins as Kings Highway at the intersection between SR 70 and an interchange with Florida's Turnpike (exit 152) and heads north. North of the SR 614 intersection, it veers to the northeast and changes names to Turnpike Feeder Road. The road terminates at US 1 just south of the St. Lucie-Indian River county line.

History
According to a 1960 map prepared by the State Road Department (forerunner to Florida Department of Transportation), Kings Highway had a State Road 607 designation—at the same time as Emerson Road (current SR 607) and Indrio Road (part west of Kings Highway is now SR 614), with Angle Road being SR 607A at the time.

Prior to the completion of Interstate 95 in Florida in the early 1980s, it was commonly used to "bridge the gap" between Florida's Turnpike (SR 91) and the Interstate highway.

As sections of I-95 were completed between SR 60 near Vero Beach and SR 70 in Fort Pierce between 1978 and 1980, the common methodology of using SR 713 to travel between I-95 and the Turnpike evolved:

Until early 1978, northbound motorists turned west onto Indrio Road (SR 614) and north onto Emerson Road (SR 607). After  of Emerson Road, northbound motorists turned west onto SR 60, which connected with I-95 six miles (10 km) from SR 607.
When a nine-mile (14 km)-long section of I-95 opened in 1978, northbound motorists stayed on Indrio Road (SR 614) after turning left from SR 713.
When an additional  of I-95 were opened in late 1978, motorists were directed eastward on SR 68 from SR 713 to connect with I-95. Most stayed with this route after a -long section (to SR 70) was opened in early 1979, even though Florida Department of Transportation posted signs encouraging them to avoid SR 713 altogether and use SR 70. The final segment of I-95 to be finished in Florida (Stuart to Palm Beach Gardens) was finally opened in 1987.

Major intersections

References

External links

713
713